The 57th season of the Campeonato Gaúcho kicked off on March 26, 1977, and ended on September 25, 1977. Twenty-four teams participated. Grêmio won their 20th title. Six teams were relegated.

Participating teams

System 
The championship would have four stages.:

 First phase: The twenty-four clubs would be divided into two groups of twelve teams, specifically sorted so traditional or regional rivals would be in different groups. Each team would play against the teams of their own group once, and after that, it would play twice against their rival in the other group, totalling 13 matches. The four best teams in each group qualified to the Second phase, and among them, the champions of each group would play each other to define the champions of the first stage, which would earn one point to the Finals. The three bottom teams in each group were relegated, and the other ten remaining teams qualified to the Repechage.
 Repechage: The ten teams would be divided int two groups of five. Each team played against the teams of its won group twice. The best team in each group qualified to the Second phase.
 Second phase: The remaining ten teams would play each other twice. The best team in each round would win a point for the Finals.
 Finals: The winners of the first stage and the two rounds of the second stage qualified to this stage. Each participant would have one point allotted to them by stage won, and the teams would play each other until one reached four points, with that team winning the title.

Championship

First phase

Group A

Group B

Finals

Repechage

Group A

Group B

Second phase

First round

Second round

Final standings

Finals

Selective Tournament 
Originally, only the Finalists would qualify for the Campeonato Brasileiro (in case there were only two finalists, the best team from Caxias do Sul would qualify). However, once it was decided to expand the championship for 1978, two more berths were opened, and were intended to be given to one team from Caxias do Sul and another from Pelotas, thus, a selective tournament was played with the two teams from each city. With Juventude already qualified, Caxias won the other berth in their group, while Brasil de Pelotas qualified in the Pelotas group.

Group A

Group B

References 

Campeonato Gaúcho seasons
Gaúcho